Matthew Paul Minto (born 18 December 1990) is an Australian professional rugby league footballer who has previously played for the Newcastle Knights in the National Rugby League. He also played for the Central Queensland Capras and Souths Logan Magpies in the Queensland Cup.

Playing career

Early career

Minto played his junior rugby league for the North Knights, before being signed by the Central Queensland Comets in the Queensland Cup.

At the end of 2007, Minto signed with the Penrith Panthers. He was a part of the Panthers' inaugural NYC squad in 2008, but returned to Queensland due to homesickness before he could play a game. In 2009, he signed a 2-year contract with the Canterbury-Bankstown Bulldogs. He played for the Bulldogs' NYC team in 2009. In 2010, Minto returned to the Central Queensland Comets, after finding out his partner was pregnant, while still contracted to the Bulldogs. In 2011, he joined the Eastern Suburbs Tigers. In 2012, he joined the Mackay Cutters while doing a pre-season with the North Queensland Cowboys. After winning the Queensland Cup premiership with the Cutters in 2013, he attracted the interest of National Rugby League clubs, Newcastle Knights, North Queensland Cowboys and Wests Tigers. However, a phone call from the Newcastle Knights coach Wayne Bennett swayed him to sign a train and trial contract with the Knights. After impressing in the pre-season, his Knights contract was upgraded from train and trial to a full-time 1-year contract.

2015
In Round 2 of the 2014 NRL season, Minto made his NRL debut for the Knights against the Canberra Raiders. At the conclusion of the 2014 NRL season, he was released by the Knights. On 3 November 2014, he signed a contract with Queensland Cup team Central Queensland Capras for 2015.

2016
Minto continued to play for the Capras for the remainder of the 2016 season before he was released at the end of the season after he was charged with trespassing in what the Capras board described as his second off-field incident that year.

He attracted offers from several NRL clubs but turned them down to stay in Queensland.

2017
Minto joined the Souths Logan Magpies in 2017.

Personal life
Minto was born in Rockhampton, Queensland.

Minto is the nephew of former Brisbane Broncos and North Queensland Cowboys player Scott Minto.

In March 2010, Minto pleaded guilty in Yeppoon Magistrates Court to drink driving after recording a blood alcohol reading of 0.04 on the morning of 7 February 2010.  At the time Minto held a provisional driver's license. He was fined $500 and disqualified from driving for five months. Minto's offending constituted a grade-two breach and a disciplinary committee at the Central Comets imposed a one-match suspension meaning Minto missed a trial game against the Gold Coast Titans. He also lost his match payment for the first round of the season and was ordered by the club to perform community service.

In September 2016, the Central Queensland Capras released Minto from his contract after he was charged with trespassing.  The Capras board met after learning about the incident and decided to let Minto go due to it being the second off-field incident he had been involved in that year. Minto was fined $400 in the Rockhampton Magistrates Court on 20 September 2016, but with no conviction recorded. Minto entered a guilty plea to the charge which related to him and another person trespassing on a residential property during "Silly Sunday" and attempting to enter a woman's bedroom after earlier being told to leave the property. Due to a communication mix-up, a warrant was issued for Minto's arrest when it was initially thought he had failed to appear in court on 19 September 2019 to answer the charge. However, the warrant was later revoked when it was learnt Minto had attended the Yeppoon Magistrates Court to enter a written guilty plea because he was unable to travel to Rockhampton due to a family member being unwell. He appeared in the Rockhampton Magistrates Court the following day.

In September 2020, Minto again pleaded guilty in the Yeppoon Magistrates Court to drink driving after recorded a blood alcohol reading of 0.108 when he was intercepted by police on 17 July 2020. After the court was told Minto had no traffic history of a similar nature since 2011, he was fined $650 and disqualified from driving for five months.

References

External links
Newcastle Knights profile

1990 births
Living people
Australian rugby league players
Newcastle Knights players
Central Queensland Capras players
Eastern Suburbs Tigers players
Souths Logan Magpies players
Mackay Cutters players
Rugby league halfbacks
Rugby league fullbacks
Rugby league players from Rockhampton, Queensland